The Emerson Group is one of the largest privately owned property development companies in the United Kingdom. Emerson was founded by Peter Emerson Jones in 1959 and is based in Alderley Edge, Cheshire, UK. Its subsidiaries include Orbit Developments (commercial property) and Jones Homes (residential). As well as UK operations, Emerson have activities in Portugal and Florida.

Developments
Emerson's developments include:

United Kingdom
Aintree Racecourse Retail & Business Park
Cheadle Hulme Shopping Centre
Imperial Point and Sovereign Point (residential), Salford Quays
Lowry Outlet Mall, Salford Quays - now sold to the Peel Group
Middlebrook (mixed-use) including the University of Bolton Stadium.
Parkway Business Centre, Manchester
Wilmslow, Cheshire - various developments

United States
Residential developments in Florida
Eagle Creek Golf Club

Portugal
Residential developments in Lagos

References

External links
Official Website

Property companies of the United Kingdom
Companies based in Cheshire
1959 establishments in England
Real estate companies established in 1959